Tell Kunara  is an ancient Near East archaeological site about  southwest of  Sulaymaniyah in the Kurdistan region of Iraq. It lies on the Tanjaro River. The site was occupied from the Chalcolithic period to the early second millennium BC.

History

The site was occupied in the Akkadian, Ur III, and Isin-Larsa periods. The excavators have speculated that the city, with its monumental buildings, was the capital of the Lullubi state. There were three occupational levels (levels 1 and 2 have been radiocarbon dated)
Level 1 - Middle Bronze Age (2000–1900 BC) (in Area C)
Level 2 - end of Early Bronze (2200–2000 BC) (in Areas A and B)
Level 3 - Early Bronze Age (2350 - 2200 BC) (in Areas A and D)

Epigraphic evidence shows the city had an ensi (governor) but under what auspices is unknown at present.

Archaeology

Tell Kunara consists of two oval mounds, the western one higher than the eastern, separated by a modern road. The eastern mound is designated as the Lower Town. Overall the site extends to roughly 600 meters by 400 meters or about 10 hectares. The site was first visited in 1943 when Sabri Shukri of the Iraqi General Directorate of Antiquities in Baghdad conducted a survey, issuing a report dated November 10, 1943.

The site was examined as part of a larger survey by C. Kepinski in 2011. A geomagnetic survey at Tell Kunara showed signs of a monumental (60 meters by 30 meters) building in the Lower Town It has been excavated since 2012 by a French National Center for Scientific Research team led by Christine Kepinski and Aline Tenu. Work was then conducted in 2013 and again in 2015, 2016, 2017, 2018, and 2019. A few 10 centimeter by 10 centimeter cuneiform tablets were found in 2015 (most concerning flour) and another group in 2018 (most concerning grain). Quantities were listed in a new type of gur (volume measure) not previously attested as opposed to the expected Akkadian Gur.

Area A - On the upper mound. A monumental building was found, with a 2.6 meter wide wall built on a very large stone base foundation. The walls were constructed of "layers of rectangular mud bricks, protected by diluted bitumen and jointed with a mortar containing crushed bones, alternated with about 0.60 m of pisé". The building, which overlays an earlier one with similar plan, was fronted by a 100 square meter courtyard with included a 10-meter terracotta pipe for drainage. The top of the mound had first been sealed and leveled by a several meter thick layer of sand. Small finds included a bronze pendant.
Area B - In the Lower Town, designed to explore the monumental building identified by the survey. A simple poorly preserved building was found on Level 1. On level 2 lay the monumental building that had appeared on the survey. It had 1.6 meter thick wall footings made out of massive stones with facing stones. The remains of the building on Level 3 had large walls on a completely different orientation. Small finds included a finely carved greenish Akkadian period stone cylinder seal.
Area C - A large but shallow excavation at the outer edge of the site, to the south, Level 1 remains are fragmentary but appear to be related to food production. Levels 2 and 3 so portions of a monumental building with walls 1.4 meters in width. At the lowest floor were many storage jars.
Area D - several narrow trenches on the slope of the Lower Town to look for a defensive wall and examine the interrelationship with the Upper Town. Small finds here included beads, an obsidian flint, a lithic arrow head of Akkadian type.

Excavation photographs

See also
Cities of the ancient Near East
Ancient Mesopotamian units of measurement

References

Further reading
Perello, Bérengère, Aline Tenu, and Christine Kepinski. "A preliminary assessment on earthen architecture of Iraqi Kurdistan: the case of Kunara (Suleymanieh province) at the end of the 3rd mill. BC." Terra Lyon 2016-XIIe World Congress on Earthen Architecture. 2016
 Kepinski, C., et al., "Kunara, petite ville des piedmonts du Zagros à l'âge du Bronze. Rapport préliminaire sur la première campagne", 2012 (Kurdistan irakien)." Akkadica 136, pp. 51-88, 2015
 Tenu, Aline, et al. "Kunara, une ville du IIIe millénaire dans les piémonts du Zagros. Rapport préliminaire sur la troisième campagne de fouilles (2015)." Akkadica 137.2, pp. 109–182, 2016
 Tenu, Aline, et al. "Kunara. Rapport préliminaire sur la quatrième campagne de fouilles (2016)." Akkadica 139.1, pp. 1–72, 2018
Tenu, Aline, Michaël Seigle, and Cécile Verdellet. "Kunara. Rapport préliminaire sur la sixième campagne de fouilles (2018). Partie 2." Akkadica, 2020
Tenu, Aline, et al. "Rapport préliminaire sur le septième campagne à Kunara (2019).", 2021
Marchand, Florine, et al. "Kunara Rapport Préliminaire de la septième campagne de fouilles (2019)-Chantier E." Studia Mesopotamica 5, 2021
 Kepinski, Christine, and Aline Tenu. "Kunara, ville majeure de la haute vallée du Tanjaro." Routes de l'Orient (2014)" "Marchand, Florine. "L'industrie Lithique de Kunara." Journée Chainop-Études des chaînes opératoires: Regards croisés sur le site de Kunara (Kurdistan irakien, IIIe millénaire av. J.-C.). 2021
Tenu A. and Kepinski, Christine, "Prospection dans la haute vallée du Tanjaro. Mission archéologique française du Peramagron 2011.", Études Mésopotamiennes – Mesopotamian Studies 1., 2020

External links
A Historical Treasure Bordering Ancient Mesopotamia - Jean-Baptiste Veyrieras - 03.19.2019 CNRS

Archaeological sites in Iraq